Holtedahlfonna is a glacier at Haakon VII Land on Spitsbergen, Svalbard, between Wijdefjorden and Kongsfjorden. It is named after Norwegian geologist and polar explorer Olaf Holtedahl.

References

Glaciers of Spitsbergen